Skyborg: Into the Vortex was a CD-ROM science fiction computer game released in 1995 by the trading card company SkyBox International, Inc. and created by American studio Fringe Multimedia.

Gameplay
It was based on Creators Edition Master Series a set of trading cards by various artists created especially for the game, which were released simultaneously with the game. Each copy of the game came with a random pack of the cards. Card artists included: Dave Dorman, Julie Bell (wife of Boris Vallejo), Brom, and Brian Stelfreeze. Some cards in the SkyBox Master Series: Creators Edition contain a code that can be used to complete Skyborgs mission.

Players assume the role of Skyborg, a cyborg in the year 2025, on a dangerously overpopulated Earth low on food. Dr. Sinclair Barton has created a torus-shaped pocket universe to alleviate this problem. You must enter this universe and travel from planet to planet gathering clues to figure out what has gone wrong and where Dr. Barton is.

The credit sequence featured a song by the otherwise unknown band Primal Future.

PlanetsLost – A mall-like planet. Merika – Post-apocalyptic wasteland.Survivors – Bizarre world that has physically fragmented.Grotton – Magical Medieval planet.Gibralte – Technologically advanced planet.Naugle – Swamp planet.Projectile – Polluted, mid-level technology planet.Marcon''' –

Development
The game's lead designer was Carl Schnurr.  Eric Garrison, Director of Online Services, for SkyBox was Technical Director.  This game was the brain child of George White, Mark Davidson, Eric Garrison and Rick Ferguson of SkyBox who wanted to combine a CD Rom interactive game with Trading Cards.

This was one of the first cross platform CD ROM games released.

ReceptionNext Generation'' reviewed the PC version of the game, rating it one star out of five, and stated that "Even though the game looks great, it moved about a quick as a pregnant whale, and after a few hours going around in circles, it's not going to hold much interest."

References

External links
 
 Review

1995 video games
Adventure games
Classic Mac OS games
Science fiction video games
Video games developed in the United States
Windows games